Harmon House may refer to:

Places and structures

United States
(by state, then city)
 Celora Stoddard/Lon Harmon House, Phoenix, Arizona, listed on the National Register of Historic Places (NRHP) in Maricopa County
 Harmon–McNeil House, Santa Ana, California, listed on the NRHP in Orange County
 Southwick-Harmon House, Sarasota, Florida, NRHP-listed
 John C. Harmon House, Topeka, Kansas, listed on the NRHP in Shawnee County
 Fitzpatrick–Harmon House, Prestonsburg, Kentucky, listed on the NRHP in Floyd County
 William Harmon House (Miles City, Montana), NRHP-listed
 William Harmon House (Lima, New York), NRHP-listed
 Francis E. Harmon House, Ashtabula, Ohio, listed on the NRHP in Ashtabula County
 Harmon–Neils House, Portland, Oregon, NRHP-listed
 Oliver John Harmon House, Price, Utah, listed on the NRHP in Carbon County